The 1986 2. divisjon was a Norway's second-tier football league season.

The league was contested by 24 teams, divided into two groups; A and B. The winners of group A and B were promoted to the 1987 1. divisjon. The second placed teams met the 10th position finisher in the 1. divisjon in a qualification round where the winner was promoted to 1. divisjon. The bottom three teams inn both groups were relegated to the 3. divisjon.

Moss won group A with 35 points and Brann won group B with 35 points. Both teams promoted to the 1987 1. divisjon. The second-placed teams, Drøbak/Frogn and Vidar met Tromsø  in the promotion play-offs. Tromsø won the qualification and remained in the 1. divisjon.

Tables

Group A

Group B

Promotion play-offs

Results
Drøbak/Frogn – Vidar 1–2
Tromsø – Drøbak/Frogn 2–0
Vidar – Tromsø 0–1

Tromsø won the qualification round and remained in the 1. divisjon.

Play-off table

References

Norwegian First Division seasons
1986 in Norwegian football
Norway
Norway